Greenport, New York may refer to:

Greenport, Columbia County, New York
Greenport, Suffolk County, New York